Tesomonoda is a monotypic moth genus of the family Noctuidae described by Nye in 1975. Its only species, Tesomonoda endolopha, was first described by George Hampson in 1910. It is found in New Guinea.

References

Acontiinae
Monotypic moth genera